{{Infobox radio station
| logo             =
| logo_size        = 
| name             = KTHK
| city             = Idaho Falls, Idaho
| area             = Idaho Falls, Idaho
| branding         = The Hawk
| airdate          = 1993
| frequency        = 105.5 MHz
| translator       = 105.9 K290CE (Pocatello)
| format           = Country
| erp              = 100,000 watts
| haat             = 201 meters
| class            = C1
| facility_id      = 33447
| callsign_meaning = K The HawK
| former_callsigns = KPVT (1992-1993)KOSZ (1993-2001)KPLV (2001-2004)
| owner            = Riverbend Communications
| affiliations     = Premiere Networks
| sister_stations  = KLCE, KCVI, KFTZ, KEII
| webcast          = Listen Live
| website          = 1055thehawk.com 
}}KTHK''' (105.5 FM) is a commercial radio station located in Idaho Falls, Idaho.  KTHK airs a country music format branded as "105 The Hawk". The station is owned and operated by Riverbend Communications.

Current On-Air Staff

- The Bobby Bones Show (Mornings 5am - 10am)

- Katie Lee (Middays 10am - 3pm)

- Brenden Peach (Afternoons from 3pm - 7pm)

References

External links

THK
Country radio stations in the United States